This is a list of topics about the strawberry. The strawberry is a widely grown hybrid species of the genus Fragaria (collectively known as the strawberries). It is cultivated worldwide for its fruit. The fruit (which is not a botanical berry, but an aggregate accessory fruit) is widely appreciated for its characteristic aroma, bright red color, juicy texture, and sweetness.

Strawberry topics

Companies

 Driscoll's – a privately held company that sells fresh strawberries and berries
 Wish Farms – the largest producer and shipper of strawberries in Florida

Dishes and foods

 Bubu Lubu
 Fraise Tagada
 Strawberry cake
 Strawberry Delight
 Strawberry ice cream
 Strawberry jam
 Strawberry pie
 Strawberry rhubarb pie
 Strawberry sauce
 Strawberry shortcake

Beverages
 Bloodhound (cocktail) – a bright red strawberry cocktail made with gin, vermouth and strawberry coulis
 Fruli – a strawberry Belgian fruit beer, produced at a craft brewery near Ghent, Belgium
 XUXU – a liqueur produced in Germany which derives its flavor from the strawberry fruit. It also has a small amount of lime juice.

Events

 Florida Strawberry Festival – an annual event that takes place in Plant City, Florida
 National Strawberry Festival – occurs over three days in Belleville, Michigan
 Strawberry Fair – a local festival of music, entertainments, arts and crafts. which has been held in Cambridge, England, since 1974

Flavor
 Ethyl methylphenylglycidate – an organic compound used in the flavor industry in artificial fruit flavors, in particular strawberry.

Organizations
 California Strawberry Commission –  state-chartered agency of the California Department of Food and Agriculture

Propagation
 Breeding of strawberries
 List of strawberry diseases
 Strawberry diseases (Category)
 Strawberry pests (Category)

Cultivars

 List of strawberry cultivars
 Little Scarlet – according to Wilkin & Sons Limited, it is a Fragaria virginiana strawberry. It is American by origin but is grown only in Britain.
 Marshall strawberry – a cultivated variety of Fragaria ananassa, that is known for "exceptional taste and firmness" and had been described as "the finest eating strawberry" in America.
 Pineberry – a strawberry cultivar with a pineapple-like flavor, white coloring, and red seeds.
 Strasberry – or Fragaria × ananassa 'Mieze Schindler' is a variety of the garden strawberry, with a raspberry-like appearance, originally developed by the German breeder Otto Schindler in 1925.

Species

  Fragaria
  Fragaria × ananassa
  Fragaria × bringhurstii
  Fragaria cascadensis
  Fragaria chiloensis
  Fragaria × Comarum hybrids
  Fragaria daltoniana
 Fragaria iinumae
  Fragaria iturupensis
  Fragaria moschata
  Fragaria moupinensis
  Musk strawberry
  Fragaria nilgerrensis
  Fragaria nipponica
  Fragaria nubicola
  Fragaria orientalis
  Fragaria pentaphylla
  Fragaria vesca
  Fragaria × vescana
  Fragaria virginiana
  Fragaria viridis
  Fragaria yezoensis

Songs
 Strawberries (song)
 Strawberry (song)

Textiles
 Strawberry Thief – one of William Morris's most popular repeating designs for textiles

References

External links